Jóhann Gunnar Sigurðsson (2 February 1882 – 20 May 1906) was an Icelandic poet. A new New Romantic-style writer, Sigurðsson studied at the Menntaskólinn í Reykjavík until 1903.

References

1882 births
1906 deaths
Johann Gunnar Sigurdsson
Johann Gunnar Sigurdsson
Johann Gunnar Sigurdsson
Johann Gunnar Sigurdsson
Johann Gunnar Sigurdsson
Johann Gunnar Sigurdsson
Johann Gunnar Sigurdsson